Gülper See is a lake in Brandenburg, Germany. At an elevation of 23.6 m, its surface area is 6.6 km². It is located in the municipality of Havelaue, Havelland district.
Since 1978 the lake has been included in a protected Ramsar site.

References

External links 
 

Lakes of Brandenburg
Havelland (district)
LGulperSee
Ramsar sites in Germany